Kai Kruse Staats is a filmmaker, science researcher, writer, and entrepreneur.

At the Arizona State University School of Earth & Space Exploration, Staats contributed to the design of off-world human habitats as project lead for an Interplanetary Initiative Pilot Project (2017–19).

Staats is Principal Manager at Over the Sun, LLC, developer of platforms for research and science education. His last film series, funded in part by the NSF, chronicled the first direct detection of gravitational waves in 2015 by LIGO, where he served as a visiting scientist.

Staats's work includes that done on iConji and Yellow Dog Linux.

Career

In 1995 he founded Terra Firma Design (TFD) and continued as its sole proprietor until 2000. TFD provided website development and marketing consulting principally for companies located in Northern Colorado, including a corporate identity package for Western Telecommunications, Inc. (WTCI), website design and maintenance for New Belgium Brewing Company, and the re-design of the RB5X, an educational and hobbyist robot then produced by General Robotics Corporation.

In 1999 Staats co-founded, and for ten years served as CEO of, Terra Soft Solutions, Inc. (TSS). TSS developed a Linux operating system (OS) for the POWER architecture with support for embedded, desktop, and server chipsets by IBM and Freescale, and computer products by Apple, IBM, Sony, and others. Terra Soft delivered the desktop OS Yellow Dog Linux and turn-key high performance computing (HPC) solutions for DoE, DoD, NASA, and higher education customers. In 2008 Terra Soft was acquired by the Japanese company Fixstars and was renamed to Fixstars Solutions. Staats became the COO.

Research 

In 2016, at The Ohio State University, Staats co-organized and -lead a prototypal workshop for the
application of evolutionary computation to astroparticle physics (CHEAPR). Since 2017, he is assisting Professor Amy Connolly and her colleagues at OSU and Cal Poly with a student project to develop evolutionary algorithms that evolve antenna designs for improved neutrino detection.

Staats was a visiting scientist at Northwestern University for the Laser Interferometer Gravitational-wave Observatory (LIGO) on the application of machine learning in detector characterization, noise mitigation, and transient (supernova) detection from late 2016 through mid 2020.

Filmography

Staats engaged in filmmaking at an early age. His first production, in 6th grade, was a LEGO-mation shot on 8mm film. He made the move to digital film during collaboration with brother Jae Staats, co-founder of the Almost Famous Film Festival (A3F) which ran from 2005-2010. His work in independent and later professional filmmaking began in 2011 at Holden Village, an isolated retreat center in the Washington Cascades.
 
From 2012-14 he produced Monitor Gray, a short science fiction film based on three short stories he wrote in high school and college.

In 2013, Staats filmed and produced Chasing Asteroid 1998 QE2 for the South African Astronomical Observatory (SAAO), documenting their observations of this near-Earth interloper. In 2017, Staats returned to SAAO, producing a short film about the first detection of merging binary neutron stars as a fully multi-messenger event.

In the fall of 2013 he was awarded his first contract with LIGO, the gravitational-wave observatory. LIGO, A Passion for Understanding is a 20-minute documentary film completed in April 2014. Subsequent NSF and university funding was provided for LIGO Generations in 2015, and LIGO Detection in 2017. LIGO Detection is distributed by the National Science Foundation's educational content library Science360, and related films are available at the LIGO multimedia archive.
 
Produced in 2015-16, I am Palestine is a short documentary that shares the stories of Palestinians who once lived side-by-side with Israeli neighbors in what is now a place with an uncertain, conflicted future. The film enjoyed screening at eight film festivals, winning awards at the NYC Indie Film Awards, Best Shorts Competition, and Best Short Documentary at the 2016 Cabo Verde International Film Festival.

In collaboration with Dr. Paul M. Sutter, Staats produced Song of the Stars, a film of the one-time live performance of a modern dance that tells the story of the first stars in the universe.

References

American inventors
American software engineers
American filmmakers
American technology writers
Arizona State University alumni
University of Cape Town alumni
International Space University alumni
1970 births
Living people
Creators of writing systems